Karen Nathalia Riveros Schulz is a Paraguayan swimmer.  At the 2012 Summer Olympics, she competed in the Women's 100 metre freestyle, finishing in 41st place overall in the heats, failing to qualify for the semifinals.

References

External links
BBC Sport - London 2012 Olympics Profile

Paraguayan female swimmers
Living people
Olympic swimmers of Paraguay
Swimmers at the 2012 Summer Olympics
Swimmers at the 2016 Summer Olympics
Swimmers at the 2015 Pan American Games
Paraguayan female freestyle swimmers
1994 births
Swimmers at the 2011 Pan American Games
Pan American Games competitors for Paraguay
21st-century Paraguayan women
20th-century Paraguayan women